Nguyen Phuong Linh (born 1985)  is a Vietnamese born, Hanoi-based conceptual artist. Nguyen Phuong Linh's multidisciplinary practice spans installation, sculpture and video. Her work conveys the sense of the alienation, the dislocation and the ephemerality of human life.

Linh concerns about geographic cultural shift, traditional roots and fragmented history in Vietnam – a complex nexus of ethnicities, religions, and cultural and geo-political influences. Nguyen Phuong Linh often travels, field researches and collects artifacts from historical sites of exchange and borders. She transforms these materials in order to construct alternative perspectives and interpretations to fragmented histories and personal narratives.

Life
Nguyen Phuong Linh was born and raised at Nha San Studio, the first alternative artist-run space for experimental art in Vietnam that was co-found by her father and based in their home. Phuong Linh's artistic sensibility and curiosity was developed through dialogue and interaction many of Vietnam's most respected artists, writers and composers. She has demonstrated a deep understanding and involvement in the local art community both as an artist and an art organizer. Since the closure of Nha San Studio due to authority, Linh has organized various mobile as well as large scale projects for Nha San artists in Vietnam and abroad. In 2013 she co-found Nha San Collective, a group of local artists who dedicate to pushing the examining traditional, local and global socio-political contexts and history. Nha San Collective supports each other in pushing the boundaries of expression in Vietnam as well as seeks and nurtures other young artists in the community with or without a physical space.

Work

Sanctified Clouds (2012/2015)
Sanctified Clouds (2012/2015) is a wall installation of a series of photographs collected from the Internet, cropping off the landscapes and violent scenes and leaving only the dust and smoke of explosions and war. It brings out a sense of glorious power, despite being the symbol of destructive weaponry. From afar, the smoke looks like the neutral clouds, but in close-up view, it is the representation of power.

Home project (2012)
In Home project (2012), Phuong Linh's father shipped her iron wood  from the floor of a Catholic church and windows from a Mental hospital  in the North Vietnam to Oakland.  The wood was transported same way that American Government  sent the first container of weapon, medicine, food... to Vietnam in 1967 and Linh made a boat out of that.

Dust project (2011-2012)

For the Dust project (2011-2012), Linh collected dust from various places and objects such as: Long Bien bridge, the first steel bridge in Hanoi that was built by the French in 1887, a bomb shelter  in an old house in Japan, the border between North and South Korea, Oakland port (USA)  that shipped the first container of weapon to Vietnam,  etc...All objects and spaces where the dust was from were documented and printed by blue print in Japan.

Salt project (2009)

In Salt project (2009), inspired by the salt villages of northern Vietnam. Nguyen Phuong Linh made installations from unrefined, handmade salt. Nguyen conceived of this work as the act creating a minimal landscape in space. The sculpture is intended to dematerialize while it is on view. As the water evaporates, the salt begins to crumble and dissolve, its disappearing form symbolizing the way that events in history may slip away from memory or exist only as fragmented forms in our minds. As Nguyen observes, "It’s very exciting to me that the salt is melting during the exhibition; this makes the work continuous and perhaps never truly finished. The landscape is slowly transforming all the time."

Exhibitions

In 2009, she exhibited the first solo exhibition Salt at Galerie Quynh Vietnam. In 2011, Linh participated in 11th Winds of Artist in Residence at Fukuoka Asian Art Museum with a solo exhibition Dust. In 2012 she presented project Home in the exhibition Hinterlands at the Luggage Store Gallery in San Francisco, United States. In 2013, she participated in the large exhibition HIWAR, 25th anniversary of Darat Al Funnun in Amman, Jordan. In 2015, Linh participated in the Mien Meo Mieng Exhibition, showcasing contemporary Art from Vietnam in Umea, Sweden. In 2016, she will participate in Singapore Biennale

Art organizing and curatorial practice
Since 2010, together with her fellow artist friend Bill Nguyen, Linh found and organized IN:ACT- the annual international performance festival in Vietnam, the annual international performance art festival in Hanoi.

In 2012, she found and organized Skylines With Flying People, one of the most ambitious contemporary art events in Vietnam in the last decade with local and international artists and curators from Vietnam, Japan, Germany, US, Serbia, Shanghai, Korea... at Japan Foundation, Nha San Studio, Goethe Institute, Manzi Art Space and many public sites in Hanoi. The project took place at the Japan Foundation and was the first of its kind in Hanoi, representing alternative ways of art-making and exhibiting.

In 2013, Linh co-founded Nha San Collective.

References

External links
 Official website (archived)

Vietnamese contemporary artists
1985 births
Living people